The 1970 San Jose State Spartans football team represented San Jose State College during the 1970 NCAA University Division football season as a member of the Pacific Coast Athletic Association. The team was led by head coach Joe McMullen for only the first three games of the 1970 season. He was replaced by DeWayne "Dewey" King as of the fourth game of the season. They played home games at Spartan Stadium in San Jose, California. They finished the season with a record of two wins and nine losses (2–9, 2–3 PCAA).

Schedule

Team players in the NFL
No San Jose State players were selected in the 1971 NFL Draft.

Notes

References

San Jose State
San Jose State Spartans football seasons
San Jose State Spartans football